Carlos Antonio de Souza Júnior (born 8 August 1994), commonly known Carlinhos Júnior, is a Brazilian professional football player, who plays as a winger, forward for Shimizu S-Pulse.

Career

Early career
Carlinhos Júnior went through the youth ranks of Paraná, before being promoted to the first team in 2013. He had a short spell at Botafogo–PB in 2016.

Lugano
Carlinhos Júnior was signed by Swiss club Lugano on 7 January 2017. He made his debut for the club on 4 February as a starter in a 4–0 away loss to FC Basel. He played 78 minutes before being substituted by Ofir Mizrahi. Carlinhos Júnior scored his first goal for Lugano the following week in a 3–0 home win over Grasshoppers. His first six months for Lugano resulted in 16 appearances in which he scored four goals.

Carlinhos Júnior made his European debut on 19 October 2017 in a Europa League group stage match against Czech side Viktoria Plzeň, in which he scored the second goal in a 3–2 home win. His second season in Lugano resulted in 35 appearances across all competitions in which he scored 12 goals, as the club ended in a disappointing ninth place during a close Swiss Super League season.

Carlinhos Júnior has his best season in his third year at the club, with him scoring 14 goals in 33 appearances and Lugano ending in third place which meant qualification to the Europa League.

Shimizu S-Pulse
On 23 February 2020, Carlinhos Júnior signed a three-year contract with Japanese club Shimizu S-Pulse.

Personal life
Carlinhos Júnior gained internet fame as a player for Salford City in the FIFA 20 road-to-glory series by YouTuber Barfieboy. During the series, Carlinhos was commonly referred to as The Patch or El Capitano.

Career statistics

Honours
Botafogo-PB
 Campeonato Paraibano runner-up: 2016

References

External links

1994 births
Living people
Footballers from Rio de Janeiro (city)
Brazilian footballers
Association football forwards
Campeonato Brasileiro Série B players
Campeonato Brasileiro Série C players
Swiss Super League players
J1 League players
FC Lugano players
Shimizu S-Pulse players
Paraná Clube players
Botafogo Futebol Clube (PB) players
Brazilian expatriate footballers
Brazilian expatriate sportspeople in Switzerland
Expatriate footballers in Switzerland
Expatriate footballers in Japan